Thom Thomas (August 31, 1935 – December 2, 2015) was an American actor, screenplay writer and playwright.

Biography
Thomas Neil Thomas was born in Lawrence, Pennsylvania. He went to the Pittsburgh Playhouse School of Theatre from 1958 to 1960 before attending Carnegie Mellon University. In 1966 he became a member of the American Conservatory Theater under the helm of William Ball.  He received the Cameron Overseas Grant from CMU to study in Europe where he joined the Young Vic.  Upon returning to America in 1967, he joined the faculty at Point Park College in Pittsburgh, where he led the theatre department from 1974 to 1977. He became artistic director at the Pittsburgh Playhouse and also was the artistic director for the Pittsburgh Civic Light Opera in 1972, where he directed the entire inaugural season at newly restored Heinz Hall.  In 1974 he was honored as "Man of the Year in Theatre" by the Pittsburgh, Pennsylvania Jaycees. He began his career in theatre at Little Lake Theatre in Canonsburg, Pennsylvania, where he acted in or directed 30 plays from 1958 to 1964. In 1965 he was the co-producer and director at The Rabbit Run Theatre in Madison, Ohio and later at The Odd Chair Playhouse in Bethel Park, Pa.  He has been the author of a number of screenplays, including episodes for Hotel, Hill Street Blues and A Year in the Life.  He wrote and co-produced the pilot for the proposed series "Private Sessions" starring Mike Farrell and Maureen Stapleton.  On July 2, 2014, he married Janis V. Purins (a.k.a. John Purins), with whom he had been living as domestic partners since they met at the Pittsburgh Playhouse in 1973. In November, 2015, he was collaborating with Iris Rainer Dart on rewrites for the stage musical, Beaches, based Dart's popular novel and was making final edits on his screenplay, Vanished, adapted from the novel by Mary McGarry Morris when he was diagnosed with acute myeloid leukemia and died in two weeks. Thomas has been the recipient of a number of grants, including from the Ford Foundation (1969) and the National Endowment for the Arts (1978).

Plays

The Interview, his first major play, was produced with Jose Ferrer as director and actor at the Pittsburgh Playhouse. In 1976, The Interview was produced Off-Broadway. His other plays include The Ball Game which premiered at Playwrights Horizons and later opened at the Open Space Theatre in London, England, and Without Apologies, which premiered at The Pittsburgh Playhouse and later at the Dorset Theatre Festival directed by Edgar Lansbury which moved to a successful off-Broadway production at the Hudson Guild Theatre starring Carrie Nye and Pauline Flanagan.  Both "The Interview" and "Without Apologies" are published by Samuel French, Inc.

A Moon To Dance By is a play that was first shown at the New Harmony Theatre, Evansville, Indiana in 2004, starring Jana Robbins and, after revision, in 2009 with Jane Alexander at the Pittsburgh Playhouse and later at the George Street Playhouse in New Brunswick, New Jersey. Both productions were directed by Edwin Sherin. Based on an actual meeting between Frieda Weekley and her estranged son Monty at the ranch, she shared with her lover after the death of her husband D. H. Lawrence in 1939, the play examines the dynamics of a meeting between a mother who follows her own calling and the needs imposed on her by family and conventions. The play received "Best Play, Best Ensemble, Best Actress, and Best Actor" in 2009 by The Pittsburgh Post-Gazette, was nominated by the American Theatre Critics Assn. as "Best Play", and was nominated for the 2009 Pulitzer Prize in Drama.  He is the co-writer (2012) along with novelist Iris Rainer Dart of a proposed Broadway musical, Beaches, based on Dart's popular novel and film. It had its world premiere at the Signature Theatre in Arlington, Virginia in February 2014.  Eric D. Schaeffer is the director.

Thomas was a member of the Dramatists Guild of America, the Academy of Television Arts and Sciences, and Writers Guild of America West.

References

External links

20th-century American dramatists and playwrights
American male screenwriters
Carnegie Mellon University College of Fine Arts alumni
1935 births
2015 deaths
People from Washington County, Pennsylvania
Point Park University faculty
American male dramatists and playwrights
Writers from Pennsylvania
20th-century American male writers